Jan Brzechwa, (15 August 1898 – 2 July 1966) was a Polish poet, author and lawyer, known mostly for his contribution to children's literature. He was born Jan Wiktor Lesman to a Polish family of Jewish descent.

Early life 

Brzechwa was born in Żmerynka, Podolia.  His father was a railway engineer and Jan spent a lot of his childhood travelling around Eastern Poland ("Kresy") with his family. Brzechwa studied at the  Jesuit college in Chyrów, (present day Khyriv in Ukraine), and upon moving from Podolia to Warsaw, he graduated from the School of Law at the Warsaw University. During the Polish-Soviet War, he volunteered for the 36th Regiment of the Academic Infantry Legion, a formation composed of university students and was decorated for his service. His formal writing debut took place in 1920 by way of various humor magazines. He worked as a lawyer and attorney for the Polish Society of Authors and Composers (ZAIKS) where he specialized and excelled in copyright law.

Brzechwa was a cousin of another famous Polish poet, Bolesław Leśmian. He was married three times; first to Maria Sunderland, his first cousin once removed and a niece of the renowned Polish artist Celina Sunderland, then to Karolina Lentowa (née Meyer), and finally to Janina Magajewska (1915–1989). His daughter from his first marriage, Krystyna (born 1928), is a painter.

Literary output

Jan Brzechwa was the writer's pseudonym. The name Brzechwa translates into 'fletching' (the tail section of an arrow). His poetry was written mostly in the melodic style of the 8-syllable accentual verse, the most popular rhythmic structure among the Polish stylistic variations.

In 1926 he published Oblicza zmyślone ("Imaginary visages"), his first book of poems. His first set of poems for children Tańcowała igła z nitką ("Danced the needle with the thread") was published in 1937. Among his most popular works is Chrząszcz (The Beetle), a poem proverbial for the hardest-to-pronounce phrase in Polish literature, even for adult native Polish speakers. Its first line "W Szczebrzeszynie chrząszcz brzmi w trzcinie" (In the town of Szczebrzeszyn a beetle buzzes in the reeds) is the best known Polish tongue-twister, in which almost all of the consonants make distinct buzzing sounds. Brzechwa is also popular in Poland for having written a number of lyrical children's poems. He was a translator of Russian literature, translating works by Aleksandr Pushkin, Sergey Yesienin and Vladimir Mayakovskiy.

Brzechwa also wrote a long-running series of children's books based on the adventures of Pan Kleks, the headmaster of a magical academy, and his students. Many of the Kleks books and plot points were made into a series of films in the 1980s, while the poem Pchła Szachrajka (Adventures of a Cheating Flea) was developed into an animated film in 1989.

Many of Brzechwa's texts have been translated into English by Walter Whipple, but as of 2004 they have yet to be published. Brzechwa died in Warsaw in 1966 and is buried at the Powązki Cemetery, the most famous cemetery in the city.

Works

 1926 – Oblicza zmyślone
 1937 – Tańcowała igła z nitką
 1938 – Kaczka Dziwaczka
 1946 – Akademia Pana Kleksa
 1946 – Ptasie plotki
 1946 – Pan Drops i jego trupa
 1948 – Na wyspach Bergamutach
 1948 – Opowiedział dzięcioł sowie
 1948 – Przygody rycerza Szaławiły
 1951 – Uczymy się chodzić

 1953 – Teatr Pietruszki
 1953 – Wagary
 1957 – Magik
 1958 – Wyssane z palca
 1958 – Sto bajek
 1961 – Podróże pana Kleksa
 1964 – Śmiechu warte
 1965 – Od baśni do baśni
 1965 – Tryumf pana Kleksa

See also

 List of Polish language poets
 Polish literature

References

 Poem "Na straganie" by Brzechwa in English translation - Internet Archive copy of the accurapid.com. 
 Poems by Jan Brzechwa in English translation at paczemoj.blogspot.com. Retrieved 14 December 2011.

External links
 Jan Brzechwa at Culture.pl
 Jan Brzechwa at poezja.org

1898 births
1966 deaths
People from Zhmerynka
19th-century Polish Jews
Polish children's writers
Jewish poets
University of Warsaw alumni
Burials at Powązki Cemetery
Children's poets
20th-century Polish poets
20th-century Polish male writers